Discipline refers to rule following behavior, to regulation, order, control and authority. It may also refer to punishment. Discipline is used to create habits, routines, and automatic mechanisms such as blind obedience. It may be inflicted on others or on oneself. Self discipline refers to the practice of self restraint, controlling one's emotions, and ignoring impulses.

History
Disciplinarians have been involved in many societies throughout history. The Victorian era resulted in the popular use of disciplinarian governance over children. Edward VIII had a disciplinarian father, and the English had modeled the royal families during this era. Edward's grandmother was Queen Victoria who had championed the role of the family unit during her reign. Disciplinarians will enforce a stricter set of rules that are aimed at developing children according to theories of order and discipline. Disciplinarians have also been linked to child abuse in numerous cases and biographies.

Common techniques
Time management is a form of discipline that utilizes time as the regulator and the observer of time as the governor. The requirement is for time to be used efficiently. This activity maximizes the result of a set of activities by marking each activity within a boundary of time. To improve efficiency activities that are not necessary to complete the current activity or goal should be completed separately without interruption, this is the alternative to multi-tasking. Time management can utilize skills, tools, or techniques to create specific time allotments according to a range of organization methods.  Time management for discipline scheduling should involve focusing on one or two tasks, since we "start small and build on success incrementally", clearly defining what you plan to undertake and when you intend to do it, and focus on what we are doing rather than focusing on what we want to resist doing. 

A major theme arising from time management is that of modifying behavior to ensure compliance with time-related deadlines. It may be utilized by an emphasis on completing goals rather than a specific task, completing short and non-urgent tasks first, complete urgent and high importance tasks second and make progress on less urgent tasks which are time-consuming in the middle of the working day. More commonly segregating operations to different individuals as opposed to overlapping activities, more efficiently organizing and completing tasks, this may however increase the need for supervision, non-group fixed milestones, and intermittent reports. This theme is interrelated with discipline and methods of discipline that can be used to incentivize group or personal responsibility and reducing wasted hours by performance drops or irrelevant tasks to completing a deadline. Time management is about non-punitive scheduling and goal-oriented programs. Team-based time management is exemplified by good questioning. Meeting times can be significantly reduced by asking why we need to meet to accomplish this, what will we do differently if we succeed and how will this further the vision or goals of our team, group or organization? 

Disciplined time management includes removing distractions, a difficult but useful way of building discipline and essential component of time management. Writer of No B.S. Time Management for Entrepreneurs suggests firstly that awareness is to use your time as though it where extremely valuable, only through control of your time can you have a reasonable chance of fulfilling all your potential. Only knowledge of how your time is squandered, wasted, used productively or abused can you tell the difference between success, problems, opportunities and failings. Secondly of decision, achievement always follows from a great decision, rarely from accident its from decision. From your ability to place great importance on time can you create the ability to make certain decisions. Thirdly, follow-through on a decision is rather difficult but starting can be easy so we need to be tough-minded. Good actions always come from a supportive environment of disciplined behavior, where its required and rewarded.  
Responsibility-centered discipline or responsibility-based discipline co-opts the members to understand remedies for problems in an organization. Responsibility-based discipline is about expressing the warmth of appreciation, embracing interests, highlight effort and welcoming feedback, getting everyone's agreement on the set ground rules and getting students involved in classroom rules and guidelines and problem-solving, this is while maintaining dignity and observing clear limits. Remorse and empathy are taught in the form of an apology, make restitution, or create a plan of action. Limits are defined that express a teachers beliefs, demands, and expectations within the context of clear values and goals that help create a learning environment. Though responsibility-centered discipline is to make choices that embody these core values of integrity, perseverance, respect, and responsibility, rather than simply reminding people of rules. Obedience-based discipline is basing membership on hard work, diligence, obedience to authority, and self-discipline. Sending reminders about how the member can meet the performance indicators, organizational objectives, why the rules should be adhered to, or useful advice on meeting the rules day-to-day. The downside to this model is disobedience can occur when there is no punishments or rewards in place when there is no one there to administer them, since its all about whether that person is detected or not. Any students expect there should always be a reward for good behavior, thus detection is only seen as the problem to students. An obedience-based model utilizes consequences and punishments as deterrents, responsibility-based model moves away from using merely rules, limits, and consequences, and away from punitive measures like detention, suspension, expulsion and counseling. Students have displayed improved academic success, behavior management, in the school climate, student and teacher satisfaction using responsibility-centered discipline, using a five step rule based technique to help create solutions: 
Support – Makes the student feel valued
Expectation – Reinforces what is expected
Breakdown – Communicates how the expectation broke down or where there was failure to meet
Benefit – Relays to the student how important it is to meet the expectation and how it benefits them
Closure – Determine whether the situation has been resolved or if the conversation is at a place where the student can move on

Additionally conduct grades reflect a student’s willingness to develop and internalize responsible behavior. Most schools fail to achieve exemplary role models and changes that last because the students finds way of offloading and project their behaviors onto others. Responsibility-Centered Discipline was created by Larry Thompson to help educators learn the necessary skills and develop a plan to systematically make a culture of student self-responsibility for their schools. Its meant to take responsibility off of teachers and put them on the self responsibility of the students so they take ownership of their behavior, this is an example of organizational culture. This is a move away from using punishments and time-based consequences to responsibility based since it prevented students from learning from the problem. The disadvantage of a obedience “rule-based” approach is that there would be unclear suggestion about the rules, "your not allowed to XYZ" which could be dismissed, argued or otherwise ignored by the person in question. Responsibility is not a system of punishments or consequences, it trains students to get control of themselves and enables students to take responsibility for their actions and to create solutions, making for a fairer way of handling the classroom.
Assertive Discipline is obedience-based responsibility. It asserts some things as true for the classroom. Students have the right to a distraction free classroom, that means the teacher has the right to discipline students that is what could be for the benefit of the class, they also should be caring about the students interests. Teachers should be able to keep a peaceful working environment, this means the right to work comes at the expense of a students rudeness or misbehavior, it should not be able to run amok and undermine that right to work. Teachers should be in control. Safety and education is a guarantee only if the duty to control is upheld. Teachers get all students to consent to the rules, in understanding them the inappropriate behaviors and appropriate behaviors are emphasized, underlining what correction should occur if they student steps outside those boundaries. Assertive Discipline has the advantage of properly rewarding behaviours in front of the whole class, respect of the rules, compliance and manners are greatly appreciated in this type of teaching. There is lots of repetition of the behaviors that the teacher respects, and who is responsible for their continued recognition. There are consequences for each action, although its good if positivity is the focus, its not always possible when students overstep boundaries. Disciplinary action should always take place, applied equally, in all instances should this be done and written down in advance. This is so all students believe that the rules are serious and is really respected. Its not always enough to simply provide necessary rewards and punishments for good and bad behaviour, a teacher must earn respect and trust from the students. Assertive Discipline is about modeling good behaviour so that students know how this looks in practice. Instructing students what behavior roles should be followed. All students including difficult students will react positively to the assertive discipline model, Canter has argued after working with special need students. Proactive discipline is better than reactive discipline, meaning there is always a plan to be followed, discipline bad behavior only when it arises, make an emphasis on the rules and praise when there is good behavior. Canter and Canter state that trust can be built through learning about the students lives and things such as greetings, using their names, their interests, one-to-one conversations, knowing and congratulating on birthdays and special events, and visiting with their parents and learning about their lives that way.

Assertive Discipline model was developed be Lee Canter and Marlene Canter. It fails to address the specific needs of individual students. The downsides of this model is there is a lot of rigidity to planned disciplinary actions, it does not address the root causes of misbehavior, the underlying cause of misbehaviour is often overlooked. And its not based on the needs of the students, they are passive recipients of information of their misbehavior and they are not active in their discussion.
Team-building is part of corporate culture. It can be defined as "team-building is the process of turning a group of individual contributing employees into a cohesive team—a group of people organized to work together to meet the needs of their customers by accomplishing their purpose and goals." Additionally a team-building includes: aligning around goals, building effective working relationships, reducing team members' role ambiguity and finding solutions to team problems. Corporate culture in the form of planned activities allows employees to share their perspectives on that culture. Organization culture planned activities encourages "thought, discussion, and employee buy-in into the company leadership philosophies". An organisation might try focusing on the processes behind team building activities to try and test what could be cause of a failure. Its best to give out challenges that are substantially more difficult than the daily work or tasks employees are likely to face. Its also important that teams work on similar projects, its also important that they face work-related challenges otherwise people might believe that isn't worth the time or effort to do these challenges again. Examples of team-building include: team norms and the team-building exercise that will help create them, adopt group guidelines, share three shining work moments, sharing management wisdom, sharing personal bests and icebreakers.
Micromanaging is something that should be avoided if possible and there are useful ways to improve a relationship with your manager. At times micromanaging may be useful if you aren't performing the task up to par with the quality expected or the level of the paycheck, spend time loitering and chatting, or more seriously missing deadlines or forgetting to respond to emails, in other words things of an urgent nature. Usefully you should make alterations that fit the perspective of the manager, if its unimportant to you then it isn't a problem to defer to the manager. Always know the "how" for every step of the project right at the very beginning to ensure you are on board and push back against this if its ridiculous change to how things normally operate, if its only different then make the change. Always ask if you've met your competence requirements, then if its satisfactory you can ask to change meetings and therefore have more freedom to do things without constant oversight. Honesty is the best way on how to tell a manager how he or she is doing, if its an inadvertently micromanaging role of that manager then it pays to let them know that an largely independent worker does not need that constant oversight and to ease up. A manager's role is always at a basic level to tell an employee what to do and follow up on things.     
Habit trackers is an example of self-discipline techniques. There is an important difference between preparing foods and building a good habit, there is often a delay before we are able to obtain the necessary feedback information on whether that was a good use of our time, it can also be difficult to visualize yourself undergoing the changes that you expect a habit for us to accomplish, for us to perform and get the results. Perhaps frequent running, meditating or exercising has told you that if you stick with it you'd get the results but during this period your body is not showing any differences. Habit tracking gives you a tool to motivate you in the short-term to get those needed results. It provides a cue that you can readily use to remind you that you need to act, it motivates you to further complete habits in a timely manner and helps you endure your habit making for the longhaul by giving you immediate satisfaction for each completion since you complete an entry, with each entry it focuses you on the process, this is where habits count the most. You can also use this to cue and check off habits of avoidance.
Precommitment is a self-control strategy or technique. It includes making a decision to put limits on or tolls on what you will do in advance of what you are going to do, this is to make it more difficult or preventative measures so that we have an instrument in place so that we don't go off track or try to go offtrack. There are three pacts, an effort pact, price pact and identity pact. Effort pack keeps some work in between you and the thing we won't go offtrack on, such that we are disabling external triggers to our incorrect or undesirable routine or activity. Secondly, price pact puts in an accountability partner to keep you on track that will cause you to pay (with whatever you have agreed upon is most suitable) for the misstep in your plans or planned activity, or abiding by a self-oriented price pact to offload or bring to a charity some items you may want to, whatever costs you in a way that you'll feel at the end of the day. Identity pact includes changing how you we see and think about yourself in order to change your habitual behavioral practices inline with your new point of view, its precommitment to a self-image. All three have had an impact on people who may usually lack self-discipline or don't like using willpower or self-control to advance an agenda, all to prevent distractions according Nir Eyal.
An example of self-discipline technique is the Stoic Dichotomy of Control. This is where we write down what influences we have some or complete control over and those which we do not. Focusing your time and attention on things within the spheres of what you have control over and accepting what we don't have control over prevents our brains from seeing more problems then there are solutions, not being able to figure out what's really in our control, and from having an dopamine rush that normally would prevent you from taking positive steps or actions towards things we can influence. 
Learning to control our reactions or learning to grant ourselves self-control. We can never control the external events or outcomes in our lives, in other words what may happen to us, yet we can control how we react. This is why discipline is useful in our lives, we can control our attitude and thats a little thing that makes a big difference. Discipline is to work effectively and positively within society, it allows us to focus on what matters like our goals and controlling our emotions, so as to "control your mind and keep it free". Reactions can have consequences for those around us and shape emotions. This is why its important to keeping our actions in mind helps prepare us for interacting and reconnecting with people. How to best react to a situation then is part of a disciplined mind and a attitude cultivated by mental discipline. Firstly, depressions and problems can be created if we do not occupy ourselves well. Secondly, lack of discipline may cause problems for social, mental and academic performance, because people spend time worrying about the scenario, how they will be responded to. Thirdly, discipline helps preserve good things like peace and order. Lastly, disciplined person understands the consequences of his or her actions. "He/ she realizes he is not only losing money-worthy things but losing respect in the eyes of society when he does something wrong" and "in society, abuse and vice will increase without discipline." Learn to control your reactive emotions.
Corporal punishment is a widely debated technique of discipline that can focus on spanking, slapping, whipping, deprivation, or hitting with an object using mild to extreme degrees of force. The general aim is to instill an understanding of consequence in the subject. Punishment can be used to instill immediate compliance as it acts as a reminder to the offender that there are consequences to their actions, especially when it comes to breaking the law. To deter would-be offenders. Corporal punishment is used in the military, its to punish unacceptable behavior and it is where strict disciplinary measures are used throughout. To provide a disincentive for not acting when requiring to act, when safety to others necessitates action, increase pain to adjust to a regiment whose misoperation or miscalculation results in injury, fatalities, damage to equipment or unnecessary delays and to efficiently, productively and effectively carry out ones duty, particularly when it is of high importance to their rank, society, and personal gratification.
A success spiral is achieving small goal after another. This leads to the expectancy factor, which encourages you to do even more. When you see yourself complete these goals it helps boost your confidence in your ability to complete things, the further your expectancy increases the higher your motivation increases. To start you deconstruct your habits into a series of routines, next you pick impossible to fail goals to help you gain momentum, then you track your progress and reflect weekly on whether you need to enlargen your success spiral. 
Other examples of techniques is to include time for personal growth, forming habit lists for proper learning, its tracking and learning, trying to-do lists, personal vision statements, seeking out inspiring stories, symbols and books, orderliness as in the quality of being well arranged or organized and the success of an individual is in their orderliness, finding the time to overcome obstacles to your personal goals, using the self-control strategy of precommitment, eat regularly and healthily, remove temptations, don't wait until it "feels" right, reward yourself immediately and schedule exercises and breaks appropriately, forgive yourself and keep moving forward, calculating the best course of action and other strategies that do involve time and effort.

Self-discipline
Self-discipline refers to the ability to control one's own behavior and actions in order to achieve a goal or maintain a certain standard of conduct. It is the practice of training oneself to do things that should be done and resisting things that should be avoided. This includes setting goals, staying focused, and making sacrifices in order to achieve those goals. Self-discipline requires practice and effort, but it can lead to improved productivity, better decision-making, and greater success in life.

This is an alternative to viewing discipline as a means to obtain more information. We can also define exercising self-control or discipline as the ability to give up immediate pleasures for long-term goals (also called deferred gratification), according to Simons. True discipline is grounded in your ability to leave your comfort zone. Habit is about wanting to change, not about wanting to sweat and undergo activity. To forego or sacrifice immediate pleasure requires thought and focused discipline. Self-discipline is, more specifically, about your ability to control your desires and impulses in order to keep yourself focused on what needs to get done to successfully achieve that goal, according to Sicinski. It's about taking those small consistent steps of daily action to build a strong set of disciplined habits that fulfill your objectives. One trains oneself to proactively follow a specific set of rules and standards that help determine, coalesce and line-up one's thoughts and actions with the task at hand. It's small acts that allows us to achieve greater goals. The key component of self-discipline is the trait of persistence or perseverance; it's the daily choices that accumulate to produce those changes we want the most in spite of obstacles. Without it, self-discipline would be largely impossible. Self-discipline, persistence and perseverance is similar to grit. 

Discipline is about inner and outer dimensions, discipline could be about the capacity to decide on what is right from wrong (internal consistency) and to use our skills well, properly or routine compliance and to adhere to external regulation which is to have  compliance with rules (external consistency). "Discipline is the thing that happens when you expend some effort (both physical and mental) to do a thing that in that moment, you don’t feel like doing... Discipline doesn’t really take into account your thoughts or feelings." that Erin Carpenter says is the beauty of discipline since what we do is something that is entirely within our control, an action is completely under our control. Secondly, it is action that completes, furthers or solidifies a goal, not merely our thought and feeling. Thirdly, an action conforms to a value. Actions are then value-laden and are therefore helpful and useful, in other words we allow values to determine the choices we make, we don't let conditions or circumstances dictate it like for example we don't wait for emotional motivation to drive us or waiting to be feeling "up to it" that day. Erin says that discipline means the perpetual practice of taking action that's inline with a rule or a set of standards, even if that rule has been self-imposed. 

Self-discipline may be an answer to procrastination according to Rory Vaden a leading psychologist specializing on procrastination. People spend time regretting things they haven't done compared to things they have done. When you procrastinate you spend time on things you don't like to do or don't think you should do and who would otherwise be someone who invests in something meaningful that could be beneficial to you. Procrastination is not laziness or relaxation. We procrastinate due to how we did last time or how we may fail to learn.

Habits take on a three step process:
1. Trigger (the thing that initiates the behaviour)
2. Behaviour (the action you take)
3. Reward (the benefit you gain from doing the behaviour)

A life changing habit is one that will help you to enhance your health, working life and quality of life. The key to using this three-step process to your benefit is identifying the emotional state or emotional responses we have to prompt us (triggers) to take an action, keeping the same reward we simply switch out the action or routine as it maybe to one that is healthier, more productive or useful to us to help us follow our rule or guidelines. Knowing how we feel we can isolate the specific behavioral patterns that prompt the learned routine and reward/outcome and planning out how we really want it to occur and take control. The behavioural responses are ones that prevent us from breaking through and hold us back. There are many ways of satisfying our emotional needs and then changing behavioural responses with ones we like. Finding what emotional state we need to be in takes effort to figure out. It takes some effort to satisfy our specific needs while having a new good or healthier habit. The reward is something that we enjoy.

There are connections between motivation, self-discipline and habits:
Motivation is the initial emotional drive or inspiration to help us develop goals and actions.
When motivation begins to waver, it's self-discipline that makes us continue on in spite of our emotions and thoughts.
Over time, self-discipline becomes less important as our behaviors and actions turn into habits.

It takes two months for a new habit to form, according to research by Phillippa Lally and colleagues. Firstly, there is no reason to get depressed because it takes more than a few weeks to develop a habit, embrace the slow move towards discipline. Secondly, making some kind of mistake has no measurable impact on any long-term habits; develop ways to get back on track, you don't have to have a perfect pattern or life. Thirdly, habit making is a process and not an event, you must embrace the process to get there, commitment is key to all disciplined people. 

When you’re building habits that will allow you to overcome your impulses, those are easy ways of achieving short-term gratification, we are likely to be free to be ourselves and only if we have control over our own mind. Controlling our mind is so that we aren't bound to believe in or to be sensitive to failure, financial strains or mental anxiety. In other words, we aren't being so reactive to life's problems but are being a proactive player. Mental anxiety, even without listing the other problems, is playing a role in making us more alarmist and overly sensitive to our environment. Chronic stress can be detrimental to the development of executive function, and may make us perceive problems where they don't exist, as outnumbering the solutions  

Brett McKay recommends we focus on whats in our circle of influence, what we we're in control of rather than our sphere of concern, whats outside of our control. Self-discipline is as simple as doing something difficult before going to bed or at other times of the day; it's merely controlling a portion of your day to build self-discipline. It's overcoming the urge to take the path of least resistance (primitive urges) in order to accomplish something long-term.

Your actions and behaviors come as a result of your ability to control yourself, this is for better and for worse. The habits are an automatic mechanism to save our willpower energy, about forty percent of our actions are driven by programmed habits, to be self-disciplined you need to control your habits. Its to stay task oriented more often. They free up our mind so that we can envision and take care of the big picture things. The longer we hold to bad habits the more difficult it is to break free from them. Also the more we resist temptations then ironically we tend to ruminate more and thus the stronger those desires tends to get.  An example of a good habit is holding an organized physical space, this makes for a relaxed, stress-free environment.

Choices can be split between what gives us short-term pleasure but long-term pain, which is called experiencing immediate gratification, or interestingly has us experience short-term pain and long-term pleasure thus allowing us to experience delayed gratification. Habits get us doing things only for a long while, it may not have us stuck to routine as we think,  we in order maintain habits you have to put effort into them while you’re doing them. Discipline is making our habits to be done exactly as said we must do them, rather than relying on merely the cue for the help we turn that 'should do' to a 'must do' so that we are in a better position to accomplish them and beat a competing behaviour. Doing "that ideal routine" when there isn't a cue to. Doing something as soon as we can is discipline, habit is when we're prepared to and have that inclination. Its a good level of and relevant level of buffering of competing behaviors. To change a behaviour we need discipline to be able to do it.

There are three ways to learn to build discipline according to Sam Thomas Davies. The first is self-assessment, identify the why behind what you need discipline for, use a focusing question and make it essential your one thing that is going to get you to this. Find out the cause of resistance and learn to buffer it by doing your routine instead of excuses, sleeping or giving in to peer pressure. Secondly, self-awareness is learning to understand why you don't break your habits. Its simply because we don't have an understanding of how easy it is to give in to our impulses or urges rather than stay on track. The answer is to eliminate anything that will distract you, become indistractable, become a Choice Architect. "Out of sight, out of mind" is the saying applicably. Thirdly, self-celebration is to celebrate or reward your efforts for each win you accumulate every single day, celebrate when you fail to live up to your expectations as you now have learned something new by that opportunity or better yet celebrate your progress.

There is a difference between active goals and passive goals. Passive goals are just goals we've thought of and include ways of doing things that can cater to those goals. Active goals are written, they have specific and measurable quantities or qualities, there is a plan towards their attainment. Included in these goals is setting long-term goals, as well as achieving and setting out to do daily tasks because we've set a set of active goals, we find it easier to achieve things this way. It provides some much needed direction. May help us avoid distractions as we've put into words and written down just what we will do.

In religion

Self-discipline is an important principle in several religious systems. For example, in Buddhist ethics as outlines in the Noble Eightfold Path, the element of commitment to harmony and self-restraint has been described as a moral discipline.

For some Christian ethics, virtues directed by the beatitudes were formally replaced by ascetical theology and obedience-based discipline, which changed orientation from the Gifts of the Holy Spirit to that of an authority, blessed but not possessing the same happiness which was given forth by adherence and observances. In the Medieval period, spirituality and morality were closely connected and even thought of as being practically the same. The beatitudes were made an organizational principle since Saint Augustine. However, Christian ethics didn't have its existence as a form of discipline until the late, middle Medieval period, and along with Lutheranism and post-Enlightenment obedience-based discipline has been the new form.

The Catechism of the Catholic Church defines "The object, the intention, and the circumstances [as] the three "sources" of the morality of human acts"  A good intention cannot justify the means; and some acts are always wrong to choose. The Holy Spirit remains vital to understanding, "the eternal Word of the living God, [and] must, through the Holy Spirit, open (our) minds to understand the Scriptures."

Alexander Maclaren suggested the duty and discipline of grace and the hope born of this life and carried throughout life can be described as follows:

'grace' means the sum of the felicities [happiness] of a future life. That is clear from two considerations — that this grace is the object of our hope all through life, which only an object beyond the grave can be, and also that its advent is contemporaneous with the revelation of Jesus Christ. The expression, though unusual, is valuable because it brings out two things. It reminds us that whatever of [the] blessedness we may possess in the future it is all a gratuitous, unmerited gift of that loving God to whom we owe everything."

Self-discipline is how our self-control is gained, and the way our hope is maintained. "Hope follows desire. The vigor of our hopes is affected by the warmth of our desires. The warmth of our desires towards the future depends largely on the turning away of our desires from the present."

Control

Self-control is a lack of impulsivity, eating disorders and addictive behaviors. The first steps of any individual seeking to better themselves is overriding these impulses. The ability to regulate one's emotions and behavior is a key components of our brains executive function, the skills we are born with or innate to us that help allow us to plan, monitor, and attain goals. Giving into impulses right away is what stuns our internal and external powers and our growth. Self-control is refraining from doing certain things while discipline is enacting routines or reforming ourself to better build good habits. Self-control is choosing successfully between competing behaviors to your preferred behavior or alternatives, while discipline is habits accumulating to build on what's succeeding thus they self-control and discipline may overlap. There is currently debates surrounding whether there is ego depletion (finite willpower) and whether self-control is innate individual difference v.s. a learned skill that anyone can benefit from. Willpower or self-control energy is really an waxing and waning energy, fluctuating resource that is comparable to our physical energy levels throughout the day. Anyone can still benefit form healthy habits and take counter-measures to control our behaviour (impulse control or refraining). This is a difficult measure but one we all take since everyone has domains of life in which they could use this greater willpower. The four strategies are as follows: Firstly, situation selection where we always avoid situations where you will be likely to confront temptations, secondly, situation modification as in do what you can effort wise to reduce the pull of the temptation in the situation that arises, thirdly, distraction is try to distract yourself with better alternatives, and fourth, reappraisal is change the way you think about the bad habit so you don't favor it as much as you once did.

Child discipline

Positive discipline

School discipline

See also

Conformity
Deindividuation
Diligence
Discipline (BDSM)
Disinhibition
Domestic discipline (disambiguation)
Enkrateia (self-control) 
Military discipline
Norm (social)
Obedience
Rigour
Work ethic

References

Training
Behavior modification
Virtue
Codes of conduct